All You Can Eat may refer to:

 All-you-can-eat restaurant, where a fixed price is paid for an unlimited amount of food
 All You Can Eat (k.d. lang album), 1995
 All You Can Eat (Beat Crusaders album)
 All You Can Eat (Left Lane Cruiser album)
 All You Can Eat (Steel Panther album), 2014
 All You Can Eat (Thunder album)
 All You Can Eat: Greed, Lust and the New Capitalism, a 2001 book by Linda McQuaig
"All You Can Eat" (The Cleveland Show), a 2012 episode of The Cleveland Show

See also
 Eating Out: All You Can Eat, a 2009 film